Turning, full title Turning: A Film by Charles Atlas and Antony is a documentary musical art film made by video artist Charles Atlas in collaboration with British-American artist Anohni and her band Antony and The Johnsons.

Synopsis
The film focuses on 13 New York City-based women who appeared with Antony and the Johnsons in the band's European tour in the Autumn of 2006. During the concert, each subject rotated slowly on a turntable platform on stage, her features blown up and transfigured on a screen behind Anohni and her band, then known as Antony and the Johnsons. Atlas incorporated the 13 personalities in the film and music through candid shots and playful banter to define his picturesque subjects on screen. The concert climaxed with projections of a video of late trans activist Marsha P. Johnson, the band's namesake.

The film pairs a band performance with a video backdrop of superimpositions and time-delay effects. The video uses "13 remarkable women" in the songwriter's words who stand on a revolving platform to the side of the band each with a static pose for the length of a song, staring down the camera in close-up as Charles Atlas superimposes shots from different angles and applies various camera effects.

Performers
Johanna Constantine
Catrina Delapena
Honey Dijon
Eliza Douglas
Connie Fleming
Joey Gabriel
Joie Iacono
Stacey Mark
Nomi
Kembra Pfahler
Morisane Sunny Shiroma
Julia Yasuda

Musicians
Anohni - vocals, piano
Maxim Moston - violin
Jeff Langston - bass
Rob Moose - guitar, violin
Julia Kent - cello
Parker Kindred - drums
Thomas Bartlett - piano
Christian Biegai - horns
Will Holshouser - accordion

Soundtrack

The soundtrack was recorded at The Barbican Centre, London on 4–5 November 2006 with all music composed and arranged by Anohni and performed by Antony and the Johnsons. It was officially released on 11 November 2014 on Secretly Canadian record label.

+ Digital booklet

Charts

References

External links

2012 documentary films
Documentary films about pop music and musicians
2012 films